Coddington may refer to:

Places
 Coddington, Cheshire, United Kingdom
 Coddington, Derbyshire, United Kingdom
 Coddington, Herefordshire, United Kingdom
 Coddington, Nottinghamshire, United Kingdom
 Coddington, Wisconsin, United States
 Coddington School, a historic school in Quincy, Massachusetts
 Coddington magnifier, a single-lens magnifying glass

Surname
 Boyd Coddington (1944–2008), American car customizer
 Deborah Coddington (b. 1953), New Zealand journalist and former politician
 Edwin Foster Coddington (1870–1950), American astronomer
 Emily Coddington Williams (1873–1952), American historian of mathematics, translator, novelist, playwright, and biographer
 Grace Coddington (b. 1941), creative director for the U.S. magazine Vogue
 Henry Coddington (1798–1845), English natural philosopher and Church of England clergyman
 John Coddington (b. 1937), former English footballer (soccer player)
 John Insley Coddington (fl. 1940), American genealogist, co-founding member of the American Society of Genealogists
 Jonathan A. Coddington, American biologist and museum scientist, with a particular interest in spiders
 William Coddington (1601–1678), first governor of Aquidneck Island (Rhode Island)
 William Coddington Jr. (1651–1689), colonial governor of Rhode Island
 Sir William Coddington, 1st Baronet (1830–1918), English politician